Thomas Paul Mooney (24 August 1930 – 24 June 2006) was a rugby union player who represented Australia.

Mooney, a hooker, was born in Brisbane, Queensland and claimed a total of 2 international rugby caps for Australia.

References

1930 births
2006 deaths
Australian rugby union players
Australia international rugby union players
People educated at Brisbane State High School
Rugby union players from Brisbane
Rugby union hookers